Krzanowice  (from 1936 to 1945 Kranstädt) is a town in Racibórz County, Silesian Voivodeship, Poland, with 2,157 inhabitants (2019). It lies just a few kilometers from the border with the Czech Republic.

Notable people

Vincenz Kollar (1797–1860), Austrian entomologist
Max Schirschin (1921–2013), German footballer
Anna Bocson (born 1936), Polish-Australian athlete

Gallery

References

Racibórz County
Cities and towns in Silesian Voivodeship